Rohan Tungate (born 27 January 1990) is an Australian speedway rider who has competed in the United Kingdom and Poland. He won the Australian Solo Championship in 2018.

Career
Born in Kurri Kurri, New South Wales, Tungate made his British speedway debut in 2012 with Ipswich Witches in the Premier League, spending four seasons with the club.

In 2013 he also rode in the Poole Pirates team that won the Elite League. In 2016 he doubled up between Premier League team Somerset Rebels and that year's winners of the Elite League, Swindon Robins. Tungate also raced in Poland for Start Gniezno in 2014, and Orzeł Łódź in 2015 and 2016. With Rebels teammate Josh Grajczonek, he won the Premier League Pairs that year.

Tungate was the South Australian Champion in 2015/16, the Slovakian Champion in 2016, and the New South Wales State Champion in 2016.He stayed with Somerset in 2017 after their move up to the SGB Premiership, but was dropped in May, later riding for Belle Vue Aces and going on to win the Premiership Knock-Out Cup with them.

In November 2017 he won the Jack Young Solo Cup at Gillman, and in December won the Crump Cup at Kurri Kurri. Tungate rode in one Speedway Grand Prix, the Australian round in October 2017, scoring 6 points.

In 2018, he rode for Belle Vue and also won the Australian Solo Championship in 2018.

He joined Peterborough for the 2019 and 2020 seasons. In 2022, he rode for the Ipswich Witches in the SGB Premiership 2022.

References

1990 births
Living people
Australian speedway riders
Belle Vue Aces riders
Ipswich Witches riders
Poole Pirates riders
Somerset Rebels riders
Swindon Robins riders